

As herbicides are pesticides used to kill unwanted plants, silvicides are special pesticides (cacodylic acid or MSMA for instance) used to kill brush and trees, or "entire forest" or unwanted forest species.

See also 

 Bioherbicide
 Deforestation
 List of environmental health hazards
 Soil contamination
 Surface runoff

References

Further reading 
  Allard, J. (1974) Arsenical silvicide effects on human health. See Norris, L.A. (1974a). p 4.
 Tarrant, R.F. and Allard, J. (1972) Arsenic levels in urine of forest workers applying silvicides. Arch. Envir. Health 24:277-280.

External links 

General Information
 National Pesticide Information Center, Information about pesticide-related topics
 National Agricultural Statistics Service

Regulatory policy
 US EPA
 UK Pesticides Safety Directorate
 European Commission pesticide information
 pmra Pest Management Regulatory Agency of Canada

Herbicides